Edward Vincent Curry (June 18, 1909 – March 1982) was an American politician from New York.

Life
Curry was born on June 18, 1909, in New York City. He served in the U.S. Navy during World War II. He lived in New Dorp, Staten Island, and entered politics as a Democrat.

He was a member of the New York State Assembly (Richmond Co., 2nd D.) from 1949 to 1952, sitting in the 167th and 168th New York State Legislatures. His 1948 campaign for the State Assembly made the establishment of a free college for Staten Island his primary objective. Curry's victory improved higher education on Staten Island.

He was a member of the New York State Senate (19th D.) in 1955 and 1956. In November 1956, he ran for re-election but was defeated by Republican John J. Marchi.

Curry was a member of the New York City Council from 1958 to 1978.

He died in March 1982.

Edward Curry Avenue in Bloomfield, Staten Island was named in his honor.

References
History of the College of Staten Island
A Guide to Staten Island
http://politicalgraveyard.com/bio/curry.html
http://thomas.loc.gov/home/gpoxmlc109/hr1032_ih.xml 
Map of Edward Curry Avenue in Staten Island, New York

1909 births
1982 deaths
United States Navy personnel of World War II
Democratic Party members of the New York State Assembly
New York City Council members
Democratic Party New York (state) state senators
United States Navy officers
20th-century American politicians
Politicians from Staten Island
People from New Dorp, Staten Island